Boletus orientialbus is a species of porcini-like fungus native to Fujian Province in Southeastern China, where it grows under trees of the genera Lithocarpus and Castanopsis in subtropical climates.

References

orientialbus
Fungi of China
Fungi described in 2014